Cale Gale (born March 5, 1985) is an American professional stock car racing driver and crew chief.

Karting
Gale's racing career began when his father placed him on a go-kart at age 4. In 1989 at the age of five years, he began racing competitively at Mobile Motorsports Park in Kushla, Alabama, winning five features in his first year. The following season, Gale raced a full schedule, winning 25 feature races and the track championship.

In 1991, Gale started competing at tracks other than Mobile Motorsports Park, racing at three different go-kart facilities winning a total of 12 feature races. From 1992 through 1994 he went on the road watching his father, Bubba Gale, compete in the NASCAR All-Pro touring series. After a three-year break, Gale resumed his go-kart career at Gulf Oaks Speedway in Saucier, Mississippi, winning ten features, the track championship, and also capturing his first state championship. He won his second state championship the following year, and he won seven features at Gulf Oaks.

Modifieds, Late Models and Supertrucks
Gale spent 1997 and 1998 working on his Dad's crew at Mobile International Speedway. He raced in the limited modified division (an adult class) at J & J Speedway the following year, 14-year-old Gale won three feature races and received the Hardcharger Award.

In 2000, he began his full bodied car racing career at Mobile International Speedway in the pure stock division winning nine feature races, finishing third in the point standings, and capturing rookie of the year honors. Gale won 12 feature races and the super stock track championship in just his second year at the speedway. In his first late model race at MIS, he finished third in the 40-lap Lee Fields Memorial race. The same year, at the Snowball Derby in Pensacola, Florida, Gale was the fast qualifier in the super stock division in a field of 42 cars.

In the 2002 season, Gale competed in his first full year in the late model class. He was fast qualifier five times, winning four feature races. He is the only competitor in the 28 years of racing at MIS to ever capture rookie of the year honors and the late model track championship simultaneously. He competed in the Snowball Derby at Five Flags Speedway in Pensacola, Florida, Gale qualified 7th in the Snowflake Late Model event and finished 14th.

In Gale’s sophomore season, 2003, at MIS in the late model series, he won four feature races and finished second in the points race just 24 points out of another championship.

In 2004, competing in the Southern All Stars Supertruck Touring Series, Gale won two feature races and also broke two qualifying records at Sunny South Raceway in Grand Bay, Alabama and Lanier Speedway (Gainesville, Georgia). He also raced in the Snowflake 100 (Snowball Derby), qualified eighth and finished fifth in a 28 car field in a brand new late model.

In 2005, Gale ventured down to Lakeland for speed week in his Chevy truck and sat on the pole. He started there and led every lap to win against Matt Martin, son of Mark Martin, and Jamie Skinner, (son of Mike Skinner). Two weeks later at New Smyrna Speedway, Gale broke the track qualifying record, and also won again taking both Florida races against some very well known drivers. At Birmingham International Raceway, Gale added another track qualifying record to his resume, breaking the old mark held by Jeff Wainwright. Also on April 23, Gale broke the three-year-old track record at Mobile Speedway in the super late model series with the time of 16.920 sec. Around July, Gale seized the opportunity to move to Spartanburg, South Carolina as 2005 Snowball Derby winner Eddie Mercer presented Gale with the chance to be the shock specialist for Phoenix Racing, which is owned by James Finch of Panama City, Florida. Later in the year, Finch decided to give Gale a chance to do some testing in both his Busch and Nextel Cup car.

ARCA and Busch debut
The 2006 racing season started out the same way as 2005, Gale and his dad going to Lakeland in the truck and getting the same results. They made the trip to New Smyrna as well and produced the same results, a track record and a win two weeks later. Gale competed in his first ARCA Re/MAX Series race in April at Nashville Superspeedway driving the No. 09 Miccosukee Resort & Gaming Dodge Charger. He qualified ninth and finished sixth. In June, Finch decided to let Gale make his first NASCAR Busch Series debut at the same track as his ARCA race, Nashville Superspeedway. He qualified tenth and finished 20th in the No. 1 Miccosukee Charger. Gale's next race was another Busch Series event at Chicagoland Speedway in July. He had to compete against 21 Cup drivers. He qualified 39th and finished 37th with a faulty transmission. Gale had come in on lap 192, and he had worked his way up to sixth place. He went a lap down, only to get it back 67 laps later. When his transmission started giving him problems he was running ninth. Bobby Jones Racing decided to let Gale run his number in the Shop ‘n Save 150 ARCA race at Gateway International Raceway. Gale started the No. 50 Miccosukee Charger in the fourth starting spot. He never went any further back. Finch made the call to take on two tires on lap 77. Gale took the lead on lap 90, and what looked like would be a victory was delayed by four green-white-checkered restarts. He held off Steve Wallace for the victory.

Driver development
Gale was signed to Kevin Harvick Incorporated's driver development program for the 2006, 2007 and 2008 seasons he has appeared in both NASCAR Nationwide Series and NASCAR Camping World Truck Series, as well as a handful of ARCA events for the team. He has 24 career Nationwide starts, three top 10s with a best finish of 4th in the 2008 Food City 250. He has made 6 truck starts with the best finish of 9th in the O'Reilly 200 in 2007. He also drove a limited schedule in the No. 11 in the NASCAR Canadian Tire Series in 2009.

2010–2017
Gale returned to KHI's Truck Series team in 2011, driving for six races with sponsorship from Rheem.

For 2012, Gale ran the full Camping World Truck Series season with Eddie Sharp Racing, driving the No. 33; in addition to competing for the series' Rookie of the Year title, he also competed in selected ARCA Racing Series events in the team's No. 6.

On November 16, 2012, Gale won his first Camping World Truck Series at the season finale Ford EcoBoost 200 in a thrilling finish, winning by .014 seconds. Gale failed to clear Kyle Busch coming out of turn 4 but pinned Busch against the outside wall from the turn to the finish line where the trucks separated finally.

For 2013, Gale joined Turner Scott Motorsports as crew chief for rookie driver Brandon Jones in the K&N Pro Series East; he returned to the racetrack as a driver in June at Kentucky Speedway in the Truck Series.

In 2017, Gale ran his first Truck Series race since 2013 at Martinsville Speedway's Texas Roadhouse 200, driving the No. 99 Rheem-sponsored truck for MDM Motorsports.

Outside of NASCAR
Although Gale has not raced in NASCAR since 2017, he has remained involved in the sport, building shocks and consulting for different teams. He owns the shock manufacturer and consultant group Velocity Racing Suspensions.

Gale also races super late models in the southeast.

Motorsports career results

NASCAR
(key) (Bold – Pole position awarded by qualifying time. Italics – Pole position earned by points standings or practice time. * – Most laps led.)

Nationwide Series

Camping World Truck Series

Whelen Southern Modified Tour

Canadian Tire Series

ARCA Racing Series
(key) (Bold – Pole position awarded by qualifying time. Italics – Pole position earned by points standings or practice time. * – Most laps led.)

 Season still in progress
 Ineligible for series points

References

External links
 
 

Living people
1985 births
Sportspeople from Mobile, Alabama
Racing drivers from Alabama
NASCAR drivers
ARCA Menards Series drivers
NASCAR crew chiefs